Robert Davidsohn (26 April 1853 – 17 September 1937) was a German journalist and historian. He is known for his studies of medieval Florence.

References 

 https://www.ngzg.geschichte.uni-muenchen.de/forschung/forsch_projekte/davidsohn/index.html
 https://www.encyclopedia.com/religion/encyclopedias-almanacs-transcripts-and-maps/davidsohn-robert

1853 births
1937 deaths
19th-century German journalists
19th-century German historians
Corresponding Fellows of the British Academy